The 2009 Philippine Basketball Association (PBA) Fiesta Conference or known as the 2009 Motolite PBA Fiesta Conference for sponsorship reasons, was the last conference of the 2008-09 PBA season. It started on February 28 and finished on July 17. The tournament was shortened to accommodate the training of the national basketball team for the FIBA Asia Championship 2009 qualifying tournament for the 2010 FIBA World Championship. The last conference had games on Thursdays and Saturdays. The tournament is an import-laden format, which allows an import or a non-Filipino player for each team and with a new height limit of 6-foot-6.

Two teams had new names before the start of the conference: the former Red Bull Barako was now known as the Barako Bull Energy Boosters, and the former Air21 Express were called as the Burger King Titans. However, with the failure of several business deals that would have changed the franchise's upper management, the Titans renamed into the Burger King Whoppers by their seventh game into the conference, retaining their old management headed by the Lina family.

Format
The following format was observed for the duration of the conference:
The teams were divided into 2 groups, based on their performance in the 2008–09 PBA Philippine Cup elimination round. Group A are teams that finished the Philippine Cup's elimination round in 1st, 4th, 5th, 8th and 9th positions, while Group B are the 2nd, 3rd, 6th, 7th and 10th.

Group A:
Alaska Aces
Burger King Whoppers
Coca-Cola Tigers
Rain or Shine Elasto Painters
Sta. Lucia Realtors

Group B:
Barako Bull Energy Boosters
Barangay Ginebra Kings
Purefoods Tender Juicy Giants
San Miguel Beermen
Talk 'N Text Tropang Texters

Teams in a group will play against each other once and against teams in the other group twice; 14 games per team; Teams are then seeded by basis on win–loss records. Ties are broken among point differentials of the tied teams, except for ties for #2, #5 and #8. Standings will be determined in one league table; teams do not qualify by basis of groupings.
Wildcard phase:
WC1: #3 vs. #10, with #3 having the twice-to-beat advantage
WC2: #4 vs. #9, with #4 having the twice-to-beat advantage
WC3: #5 vs. #8 in a knockout game
WC4: #6 vs. #7 in a knockout game
Best-of-three quarterfinals:
QF1: WC2 vs. WC3
QF2: WC1 vs. WC4
Best-of-seven semifinals:
SF1: QF1 vs. #1
SF2: QF2 vs. #2
Third-place playoff: losers of the semifinals
Best-of-seven Finals: winners of the semifinals
This is basically same format used throughout the 2004-05 PBA season, save for WC3 and WC4 were conducted in a best-of-3 series.

Classification round
The May 17 game between the Barangay Ginebra Kings and the Alaska Aces held at the Albay Astrodome in Legaspi was canceled when the playing court was judged as too slippery, with Ginebra leading 9–2, and 8:04 remaining in the first quarter. The game was stopped twice and the stoppages lasted two hours before the game was canceled. The game was restarted at the Araneta Coliseum on May 22.

Team standings

Results
Results above and to the left of the gray boxes are first round games; those below and to the right are second round games.

Eighth seed playoff

Second seed playoff

Bracket

Wildcard phase
Note: Rain or Shine and Burger King possessed the twice to beat advantage but it was not used as their opponents failed to win to extend the series into a deciding game.

Quarterfinals

(3) Rain or Shine vs. (6) Purefoods

(4) Burger King vs. (5) Sta. Lucia

Semifinals

(1) San Miguel vs (4) Burger King

(2) Barangay Ginebra vs (3) Rain or Shine

Third place playoff

Finals

Awards
Fern-C Finals MVP: Jonas Villanueva
Best Player of the Conference: Jayjay Helterbrand
Best Import of the Conference: Gabe Freeman

Players of the Week

Statistical leaders

Locals 
*refers that the local had a higher statistic than an import

Imports

Imports 
The following is the list of imports, which had played for their respective teams at least once, with the returning imports in italics. Highlighted are the imports who stayed with their respective teams for the whole conference.

References

External links
 PBA.ph

PBA Fiesta Conference
Fiesta Conference